St. Sebastian's School, St. Sebastian School, Saint Sebastian's School, or Saint Sebastian School may refer to:

Saint Sebastian's School in Needham, Massachusetts
St. Sebastian School in Queens, New York
St. Sebastian's Higher Secondary School in Koodaranji, Kozhikode, India
St. Sebastian's College Kandana in the city of Kandana, Sri Lanka
St. Sebastian's College, Moratuwa in Moratuwa, Sri Lanka
San Sebastian College–Recoletos in the Philippines
San Sebastian College–Recoletos de Cavite in the Philippines